Encrinurella is a genus of trilobite in the order Phacopida, that existed during the middle Ordovician in what is now Burma. It was described by Reed in 1915, and the type species is Encrinurella insangensis, which was originally described under the genus Pliomera by Reed in 1906. The type locality was the Naungkangyi Beds.

References

External links
 Encrinurella at the Paleobiology Database

Pliomeridae
Phacopida genera
Fossil taxa described in 1915
Ordovician trilobites
Ordovician animals of Asia